Hero Honda Karizma was a premium motorcycle manufactured by Hero Honda. It was first launched in May 2003, given facelifted update with some change in graphics in 2006. After that again Hero Honda given a cosmetic upgrade and relaunched as Karizma R in 2007. In September 2009, it was supplemented by another variant Karizma ZMR with Programmed fuel injection in 2009 . The production of this motorcycle stopped
in 2019 due to poor sales.

Design
Karizma has been designed specifically for the Indian market. The styling is inspired by Honda CBF600. The instrument panel and the tank recesses are also designed keeping their functionality in mind.

Engine
Karizma has the Honda's Original tried and tested, but slightly detuned version of 223 cc SOHC air-cooled engine from the CRF230 series of enduro/MX/supermoto bikes that are sold in the United States and South American markets. It has a five-speed gearbox in place of the CRF's six-speed. The engine is an all-aluminium, undersquare engine (bore 65.5 mm or 2.58 in and stroke 66.2 mm or 2.61 in) running a compression ratio of 9:1. It features a Kehlin CV carburettor with a CCVI switch.

Developments
The Sucessor of Hero Honda Karizma is Hero Honda Karizma R. The new Hero Honda Karizma R have been inspired by Eric Buell Racing's EBR 1190. The American company had a substantial role in the design of the high end bikes coming from Hero.

Related bikes
Hero Honda Ambition 135 
Hero Honda Karizma R 
Hero Honda Splendor 
Hero Honda Hunk 
Hero Passion 
Hero Pleasure 
Hero Honda Achiever 
Honda Shine 
Honda Unicorn 
Hero Honda CBZ 
Hero Honda Super Splendor 
Hero Honda Karizma ZMR
Honda Activa

References

External links
 

Motorcycles of India
Standard motorcycles
Motorcycles introduced in 2003